Gardanbori or Gardan Bori may refer to:
 Gardanbori-ye Olya
 Gardanbori-ye Sofla